Kingdom of Noricum, or Kingdom of Noric (Latin:  or )) is the Latin name for the Celtic kingdom or federation of tribes that included most of modern Austria and part of Slovenia.

References

 
Ancient history of Austria
Ancient history of Slovenia
Historical Celtic peoples
Celtic kingdoms
Austria in the Roman era
Slovenia in the Roman era